Sergei Ivanovich Ovchinnikov (born 10 November 1970 in Moscow) or Boss is a manager and former association football goalkeeper who played for the Russian national team.

Concerning his club career, he is most famous for being a part of Lokomotiv Moscow squad for more than 10 years.

Ovchinnikov was also employed as the head coach of FC Dynamo Bryansk in the Russian First Division.

Playing career
Being a Dynamo Moscow pupil, Sergei Ovchinnikov started his senior career at Dynamo Sukhumi but after a year he joined Lokomotiv Moscow. In 1992, he asserted himself in Yuri Syomin's first choice squad and remained the main goalkeeper until his move to Benfica in 1997.

In 2002, having played for Benfica, Alverca and Porto, Ovchinnikov came back to Russia to play for Lokomotiv. He became the winner Cyprus International Football Tournament 2003 with the national team

The goalkeeper played two matches for Russia in Euro 2004 but was sent off in the match against Portugal for handling outside the area.

In 2005 Ovchinnikov joined Dynamo Moscow, following former Loko coach Yuri Syomin. In 2006 Dynamo released Ovchinnikov, after the goalkeeper got involved in a clash with a referee Igor Zakharov.

Coaching career
In April 2007 Sergei Ovchinnikov became Lokomotiv Moscow club goalkeeping coach and started to work with children and the reserves. In December 2007, he became Yuri Syomin's assistant at Dynamo Kyiv.

Next, he became the new manager of FC Kuban Krasnodar in the 2009 Russian Premier League season but was sacked on 9 August, after a 0–2 defeat at home, against Saturn.

On 7 May 2010, Ovchinnikov was named the new coach of FC Dynamo Bryansk.

Achievements
 Russian Premier League champion (2002, 2004)
 Russian Cup winner (1996, 1997)
 Russian Super Cup winner (2003, 2005)
 Commonwealth of Independent States Cup winner (2005)
 Taça de Portugal winner (1999/2000, 2000/01)
 Supertaça Cândido de Oliveira winner (2001)
 Russian Goalkeeper of the Year (1994, 1995, 2002, 2003)

Career statistics

References

External links
 Sergei Ovchinnikov profile at UEFA

1970 births
Living people
Footballers from Moscow
Soviet footballers
Russian footballers
Russian expatriate footballers
Russian football managers
Russian expatriate football managers
Expatriate footballers in Portugal
Russian expatriate sportspeople in Portugal
Russia international footballers
Association football goalkeepers
FC Dynamo Moscow players
FC Dinamo Sukhumi players
FC Lokomotiv Moscow players
S.L. Benfica footballers
FC Porto players
F.C. Alverca players
UEFA Euro 1996 players
UEFA Euro 2004 players
Primeira Liga players
Russian Premier League players
FC Kuban Krasnodar managers
Russian Premier League managers
Russian expatriate sportspeople in Ukraine
Association football goalkeeping coaches